Captain Arthur Granville Soames  (12 October 1886 – 6 July 1962) was a British officer in the Coldstream Guards, a landowner, and a Sheriff of Buckinghamshire.

Early life
He was born on 12 October 1886 in Wingerworth, Derbyshire, England. He was the only son of Harold Soames (1855-1918), brewer, later of Gray Rigg, Lilliput, Dorset.

Soames's uncle, Harold's brother, Arthur Gilstrap Soames, joined the landed gentry as Soames of Sheffield Park, but he and his wife had only one daughter, Sylvia Soames. He later left Sheffield Park to Soames.

Soames's mother was Katherine Mary (1851-1932), a daughter of George Hill. He was the brother of Olave St. Clair Baden-Powell (1889–1977), World Chief Guide. 

On Christmas Day 1918, his father Harold Soames committed suicide by walking into the sea at Bournemouth, Dorset; his sister Auriol Edith Davidson also committed suicide, by throwing herself under a train at Chestnut, Hertfordshire on 5 April 1919.  She was survived by her three small daughters, aged five, three, and three months.

Career
Soames was commissioned as a 2nd Lieutenant into the Coldstream Guards on 16 August 1905, promoted to Lieutenant on 21 September 1907, and served with the regiment during the First World War.

In November 1926, Soames was appointed as Sheriff of Buckinghamshire, and was then living at Ashwell Manor, Tyler's Green, Penn, Buckinghamshire. He was appointed again the following year, 1927.

Personal life
On 20 December 1913 in London Soames married to Hope Mary Woodbine (b. 2 Aug 1893 in Westminster), daughter of businessman Charles Woodbyne Parish, of Ennismore Gardens, Kensington. The Parish family were of the Norfolk landed gentry, and Hope Parish's mother Frances Boyle was descended from John Boyle, 2nd Earl of Glasgow. Together, they had two daughters and a son :-
Sanchia Mary (Bunty) Soames (21 Sept 1914 - 1 Jan 1953)
Diana Katherine (Dido) Soames (24 Sept 1917 - 4 Feb 1997), m. 1939 Lt.Col. Hugh William Cairns, M.C. 
(Arthur) Christopher (John) Soames (12 Oct 1920 - Sept 1987)

They divorced in 1934, and Arthur Soames remarried twice:
On 23 Oct 1934 in London to Annette Constance Jardine née Fraser (b. Sep 1876, East Grinstead, Sussex)
 On 16 Mar 1948 to Audrey Alma Humphreys.

In 1934, Soames inherited the mansion and estate of Sheffield Park, Sussex, from his father's brother, Arthur Gilstrap Soames, who had purchased it in 1909, and sold the estate in 1953. He also disposed of part of his library.

He died in a London hospital on 6 July 1962 aged 75.

References

1886 births
1962 deaths
British Army personnel of World War I
Members of the Order of the British Empire